Auburn Williams (born December 2, 1989), known mononymously as Auburn, is an American singer-songwriter. She released an independent debut album, Same Giirl in 2007, which spawned the underground hit "Ewww Ewww". The song reached number six on DJ Booth's Underground chart. She then signed to Warner Bros. and Beluga Heights in early 2008 and released her first official single "La La La" (sample of ATC's 2000 song) in mid-2010. She then went on to release "Leaked" in 2016.

Life and career

1989–2007: Early life
Auburn began singing at a young age but didn't aspire to be a professional singer until 2009. She began using Myspace.com to share her music with her friends. She began gaining a big fanbase and in late 2007, she released her independent debut album Same Giirl, which gained some buzz, and also the attention of J.R. Rotem, owner of the record label Beluga Heights. The album was preceded by a single, "Ewww Ewww", featuring Chellii-B, which reached number six on the underground hip-hop chart at DJBooth.net. In addition to singing, Auburn has also showcased her ability to direct and produce videos by posting homemade creations on YouTube.NyKhaila Guy a close relative of hers always pushes her to be her best she says.

2008–present: Beginnings
Auburn gained the attention of J.R. Rotem with her first independent album. In early 2008, Williams signed to Beluga Heights with full contract with TM3 Records (2011), and distribution from Warner Bros. and Universal as the label's first female artist. She subsequently began work on her mainstream debut album.

Auburn's first official single, "La La La" featuring Iyaz, was released on June 1, 2010. The single debuted at #74 on the Billboard Hot 100 in July 2010 and peaked at #51 on the chart.

Auburn was the opening act for Jason Derulo's tour in Fall 2010. Her second single entitled "All About Him" was released on November 26, 2010. This song became a big hit in the Philippines, Singapore and Malaysia. A remix to the song, titled "All About Him (Pt. 2)", features hip-hoprapper Tyga and was released for digital download on February 15, 2011. "Perfect Two" was confirmed as the third single from her debut album and was released for digital download on April 29, 2011. Auburn also later confirmed via Twitter that she had left Beluga Heights and was now an independent artist. On January 12, 2013, Auburn released her fourth single "My Baby" for digital download.
She also made the song Perfect Two which has a breakup and best friends version.

Discography

Studio albums

Singles

References

Living people
21st-century African-American women singers
American rhythm and blues musicians
American women pop singers
Warner Records artists
1989 births
Musicians from Minneapolis
Singers from Minnesota